St. Stephen's College may refer to:

St. Stephen's College, Balla Balla, Southern Rhodesia (later: Rhodesia)
St. Stephen's College (Broadstairs), England
St. Stephen's College (Edmonton), affiliated with the University of Alberta, Canada
St. Stephen's College, Delhi, India
St Stephen's College (Hong Kong), in Stanley, Hong Kong
St. Stephen's Girls' College in Sai Ying Pun, Hong Kong
St. Stephen's Church College in Sai Ying Pun, Hong Kong
Saint Stephen's College in Queensland, Australia
St. Stephen's College, New York, now Bard College

See also
St. Stephen's School (disambiguation)